David Gordon Cripe (born April 7, 1951) is a former Major League Baseball player, known best for his three years of play with the Omaha Royals of the American Association. Cripe played for the Kansas City Royals for less than a month at the end of the 1978 season, leaving the team just before it competed in the 1978 American League Championship Series. He batted and threw right-handed.

History
Cripe played college baseball at William & Mary, and was also the school football team's punter.

Cripe began his professional baseball career with the Billings Mustangs, joining as an amateur free agent; he continued his career at the San Jose Bees, then two years with the Jacksonville Suns followed by a move to the Triple-A Omaha Royals.
According to the Kansas City Royals 1979 Media Guide, Cripe had "7 years of service in the Royals' minor league chain", including three years at the Omaha Royals, where he "played a significant role in the club's winning the American Association flag."

Cripe was the manager of the Asheville Tourists in 1982;  he is currently a physical education teacher in Moreno Valley, California.

References

External links

1951 births
Living people
Asheville Tourists managers
Baseball players from California
Billings Mustangs players
Columbus Astros players
Jacksonville Suns players
Kansas City Royals players
Major League Baseball third basemen
Omaha Royals players
San Jose Bees players
Sportspeople from San Diego County, California
Tiburones de La Guaira players
American expatriate baseball players in Venezuela
Tucson Toros players
William & Mary Tribe baseball players
William & Mary Tribe football players
People from Ramona, San Diego County, California
Mt. San Jacinto Eagles baseball players